Timocratica spinignatha is a moth in the family Depressariidae. It was described by Vitor O. Becker in 1982. It is found in Peru.

References

Moths described in 1982
Taxa named by Vitor Becker
Timocratica